Qazi Shibli (born in 1993) is a Kashmiri journalist and editor of The Kashmiriyat, a digital newspaper covering general, political and human rights news from Jammu and Kashmir. In December 2019, Shibli's detainment  ranked fifth on Times list of "10 most urgent threats to press freedom."

Early life
Shibli was born in Anantnag, Jammu and Kashmir, India, in 1993.

Awards
Shibli recently  won the annual Kamaran International award for Journalism for the year 2022.He was nominated for the award in April by George Henton, a British journalist and documentary filmmaker, Asos Hardi, a Kurdish and Iraqi journalist, and Emily Garthwaite, a renowned British journalist.

Arrests
On July 27, 2019, he was arrested by Jammu and Kashmir police and held in custody at Saddar police station in Anantnag district. He was questioned about his article and subsequent ones on the deployment of new Indian troops in the region. Shibli was detained under the recently published Public Safety Act, which allowed the arrest of people older than sixteen years old for a period of two years. On August 5, when a media shutdown in Jammu and Kashmir was imposed as a consequence of the abrogation of constitutional provisions granting special autonomy to Jammu and Kashmir, his family lost contact with Shibli. They only learned of his whereabouts only after more than 2 months in custody, when he had already been transferred to a prison in Uttar Pradesh. It was later revealed that Shibli was charged with accusations including “waging war against the Union of India,” “creating fear and panic among common people,” being “deeply involved in disrupting the peaceful atmosphere,” and seeking “to motivate the people to work for seceding the state of Jammu and Kashmir from the union of India” on August 8, leading to charges of pro-independence activity. On August 9 he was transferred to Bareilly District Prison in Uttar Pradesh, 1,300 km from his hometown. In December, Time reported on his case as one of the "10 Most Urgent Press Freedom Threats". The Committee to Protect Journalists, an international organization that defends journalists' rights, also reported on Shibli's arrest and campaigned online for the charges against him to be dropped. On April 13, 2020, he was released from prison and went back to his hometown of Anantnag in Kashmir.

On July 30, 2020, he was summoned by Jammu and Kashmir Cyber Police to appear next day at Srinagar Police Station. On July 31, 2020, he was transferred to Shergarh Police Station. On August 2, 2020, people from across the world and from different backgrounds took to Twitter to condemn Shibli's detention. On August 3, 2020, he was transferred to Srinagar Central Prison. He has been booked under 107 CRPC, a section for Security for keeping the peace in other cases. After eighteen days, on August 17, he was released.

Work

Broke the narrative on the eviction Drive Launched against the Indigenous Gujjar and Bakerwal Community with his video story. In Search of Home 

Questioned the fake Encounter in Shopian, One day after the Encounter in Amshipura Shopian, Kashmir on July 18, 2020.

Reported on the retribution faced by the Families of Militants in Kashmir.

Worked Intensively on the two siblings who went missing in Delhi and helped the families trace the duo from Kulgam Kashmir.

References

Indian journalists
People from Anantnag
1993 births
Kashmiri people
Living people